The isoprenylcysteine o-methyltransferase carries out carboxyl methylation of cleaved eukaryotic proteins that terminate in a CaaX motif. In Saccharomyces cerevisiae (Baker's yeast) this methylation is carried out by Ste14p, an integral endoplasmic reticulum membrane protein. Ste14p is the founding member of the isoprenylcysteine carboxyl methyltransferase (ICMT) family, whose members share significant sequence homology.

The enzyme catalyzes the chemical reaction
S-adenosyl-L-methionine + protein C-terminal S-farnesyl-L-cysteine  S-adenosyl-L-homocysteine + protein C-terminal S-farnesyl-L-cysteine methyl ester

Thus, the two substrates of this enzyme are S-adenosyl methionine and protein C-terminal S-farnesyl-L-cysteine, whereas its two products are S-adenosylhomocysteine and protein C-terminal S-farnesyl-L-cysteine methyl ester.

References

 
 
 

EC 2.1.1
Enzymes of known structure
Protein families
Transmembrane proteins